Trophonopsis sparacioi is a species of sea snail, a marine gastropod mollusk, in the family Muricidae, the murex snails or rock snails.

Description
The length of the shell attains 5.6 mm.

Distribution
This species occurs in Tyrrhenian Sea. at depths between 500 m and 600 m.

References

External links
  Smriglio C., Mariottini P. & Di Giulio A. (2015). Description of a new species of the genus Trophonopsis Bucquoy et Dautzenberg, 1882 (Gastropoda Muricidae Pagodulinae)from the Mediterranean Sea. Biodiversity Journal. 6(1): 441-448

Trophonopsis
Gastropods described in 2015